The Big Bounce is a 1969 American drama film directed by Alex March, based on the 1969 novel of the same name by Elmore Leonard and starring Ryan O'Neal, Van Heflin, and Leigh Taylor-Young in what was the first of several films based on Leonard's crime novels. Taylor-Young was nominated for a Laurel Award for her performance in the film.  The film was shot on location in Monterey and Carmel, California.

The book was also adapted into a film in 2004 with the same name.

Plot
Jack Ryan (Ryan O'Neal) quits his job as picker on a California farm after assaulting Comacho (Victor Paul), one of his Mexicano co-workers. Jack's boss orders him to leave town—which he intends to do, but not before visiting a local bar to wait for the next bus. While having a drink, Jack meets the town judge, Sam Mirakian (Van Heflin). Jack's honest but crusty attitude appeals to Sam, who offers him a job as handyman at his nearby motel. Jack accepts. At the motel, he cultivates a relationship with young, hot Nancy Barker (Leigh Taylor-Young), the secretary/mistress to Ray Ritchie (James Daly), a local agricultural magnate who has provided a spacious beach house for Nancy. She and Jack have several playful nighttime escapades along the beach, where she displays her penchant for antisocial and disruptive behavior. They soon become lovers. However, when her boss, Ray, orders Nancy to have sex with a senator in exchange for a business favor, she objects and realizes her stay at the beach house may soon end.

One evening, while Nancy takes Jack for a drive along a coastal highway outside of town, a pair of unruly teen-age boys in a dune-buggy attempt to hassle them off the road. But Nancy knows that game; she spitefully forces them into a violent mishap, seriously injuring them. The lovers, realizing potential problems with the law, abandon the scene without offering aid. The next morning, Judge Sam warns Jack off Nancy, whose behavior has become increasingly unstable and erratic. Later, Jack is relieved to learn that the two boys survived the highway wreck.

That evening at the beach house, while waiting for Jack, Nancy spies a man outside attempting to break in. She grabs a handgun and kills him. The intruder turns out to be Camacho. But when Jack comes upon the scene, he interrogates Nancy and correctly deduces that she intended to murder him, not Comacho. Dismissing his accusation, Nancy announces her intent to tell police that Camacho meant to harm her, so she shot him in self-defense. To strengthen her version of events, she goes on a destructive spree throughout the house. The authorities buy her story, and she is exonerated. However, Nancy and Jack decide to separate and leave town—for good.

Cast

 Ryan O'Neal as Jack Ryan
 Leigh Taylor-Young as Nancy Barker
 Van Heflin as Sam Mirakian
 Lee Grant as Joanne
 James Daly as Ray Ritchie
 Robert Webber as Bob Rodgers
 Phyllis Davis as Bikini
 Noam Pitlik as Sam Turner
 Charles Cooper as Senator

Critical reception
The film was not well received by critics. A.H. Weiler of The New York Times ends his review: 

Elmore Leonard did not like the film and called it "the second-worst movie ever made" only behind the 2004 remake.

Cultural References
In his 2009 novel Inherent Vice, author Thomas Pynchon refers to Mike Curb's score from The Big Bounce as being "arguably the worst music track ever inflicted on a movie."

See also
 List of American films of 1969

References

External links 
 
 
 

1969 films
American crime comedy-drama films
Films based on works by Elmore Leonard
Films based on American novels
Films set in California
Films shot in California
Warner Bros. films
1960s crime comedy-drama films
1969 drama films
Films produced by William Dozier
1960s English-language films
1960s American films